The Women's 5 km Open Water event at the 2001 World Aquatics Championships was held on July 16, 2001 in Fukuoka.

Results

Key: DQ = Disqualified

References

 FINA
 5 km results from Fukuoka

Open Water
World Aquatics Championships
2001 in women's swimming